In the 1990s, more LGBTQ characters began to be depicted in animated series than in any of the years before. Some Western animation like South Park, The Ambiguously Gay Duo, and The Simpsons,  would include such characters. The representation in 1990s series would also influence series in the 2000s.

Trends

During this decade, characters on Fox and Comedy Central shows comprised most of the LGBTQ characters on television. Shows like The Simpsons and South Park especially would be influential on other adult animations in the years to come. Continuing from the late 1980s, villains in Disney films which were queer coded appeared in this decade. Some argued that cable television, which began to pick up in the 1990s, "opened the door for more representation" even though various levels of approvals remained. Animation and popular culture scholar Jo Johnson argued that 1990s animated sitcoms enabled queer characters to emerge from, in his words, its "relegated position...and drop an anvil on the head of heteronormativity." She further argued that shows such as The Simpsons, Family Guy, and King of the Hill subverted the nuclear family model and the "stereotypical gender roles assigned to it." He also said that The Simpsons, King of the Hill, and South Park satirized American mores and allowed homosexual characters as part of the family. Other scholars argued that in the 1990s, animators were determined to remind audiences watching that some cartoons weren't for children, with "gay content" seen as a way to demonstrate a show is hip or sophisticated, with a running gag in The Critic that the boss of the title character believes the protagonist is gay. As such, The Critic and The Tick were said to be two animated shows with gay characters and gay references. The Simpsons would be noted as having "gay themes and characters" in various episodes.

Animation for adults
The 1990s saw various animated series targeted primarily to adults on Fox, FXX, Comedy Central, and other platforms. This included series such as The Simpsons, South Park, Space Ghost Coast to Coast, Crapston Villas, The Ambiguously Gay Duo, Space Goofs, Dr. Katz, Professional Therapist, Family Guy, and Mission Hill, all of which had LGBTQ characters in some way or another, even though many were stereotypical or were  secondary characters.

The Simpsons

From 1990 to 1994, the most prominent show in terms of LGBTQ characters was The Simpsons. In fact, The Simpsons had split from The Tracey Ullman Show which had recurring gay characters, with a gay couple which embodies the gay/yuppie stereotype, David and William, who have a daughter, with David, voiced by Dan Castellaneta, who voiced Homer in The Simpsons. However, many of the characters in The Simpsons were secondary and rarely in positions of power. Waylon Smithers and Patty Bouvier were the only recurring gay characters. The show's first episode, on December 17, 1989, introduced Smithers, who was named after gay puppeteer Wayland Flowers. Smithers was the first gay character to appear on a U.S. animated show. However, like other shows at the time, The Simpsons approached the subject gingerly, not drawing much attention to  the sexuality of Smithers, as he remained in the closet, officially, until 2016. One scholar would call The Simpsons "subversive" for satirizing and challenging social norms, traditional values, and LGBTQ representations. Even so, it was noted that Smithers is frequently dubbed as "Burns-sexual," which is used to hide his sexuality, and he has been passing his whole life, with his remaining in the closet a focus of many sketches and jokes in the show. He would also be described as a weird man who sticks to "his cartoonish closet" and as a person who is infatuated with a "vaguely homophobic" Mr. Burns, with illusions to this attraction beginning to be shown in the show's first season. Another scholar said that the sexuality of Smithers was clear from innuendos, although not explicitly stated, like him kissing Mr. Burns when everyone thinks the world is ending, in the November 1997 episode "Lisa the Skeptic".

In October 1990, a Simpsons episode, titled "Simpson and Delilah," featured a stylish assistant, Karl, who helped Homer, whose sexuality is never mentioned even though the person voicing him (Harvey Fierstein) is a gay playwright. In the episode, Karl and Homer kiss in what some say is the first animated male-male kiss to air on network television, prior to the gay kiss in the May 2000 Dawson's Creek episode, "True Love", with this same-sex kiss permitted on television due to it being in a certain context.

Creator Matt Groening, when asked in a 1991 interview if Karl was gay, said "he's whatever you want him to be" and added that including Karl was "beyond any other cartoon," even though some gay viewers were disappointed that the character didn't identify himself as gay. Groening also said there was a lack of gay characters in cartoons due to "virulent homophobia" in U.S. culture and stated that Karl had an unrequited attraction for Homer. Groening was also the cartoonist for the newspaper strip Life in Hell which included a recurring gay couple, named Akbar and Jeff.

In the December 1994 episode "Fear of Flying", Homer visits a lesbian bar with pink Venus symbols and butch-femme couples." While there, he looks around and exclaims, "Wait a minute. This lesbian bar doesn't have a fire exit! Enjoy your death trap, ladies!" This scene was a parody of a typical episode of the comedy series Cheers. By 1996, the show was said to have a recurring or well-developed LGBTQ character, like other shows on TV at the time.

A February 16, 1997 Simpsons episode, titled "Homer's Phobia", featured John Waters, a gay filmmaker, as a gay man who helps Homer Simpson confront his homophobia. The episode also pokes at general homophobia in U.S. society as a whole. The episode, which aired two months before Ellen DeGeneres came out as a lesbian on her sitcom, Ellen, came during a time there were unspoken limits on what LGBTQ content could be shown on TV. Some argued that "Homer's Phobia" did more, in terms of awareness and exposing intolerance, than "any live action show at the time." Others stated that in the episode Homer learned a "valuable lesson about tolerance" and even said he would okay with Bart, no matter which way he chooses to live his life after thinking that Bart is gay. One women's studies and sociology scholar, Suzanna Danuta Walters, would describe the episode as taking on stereotypes and employing them "even when it foregrounds their patent silliness," describing Homer as going into a heterosexual panic after finding out John is gay, and even visiting a gay steel mill, only respecting John as a gay man after he saves Bart from an angry reindeer. Walters would also argue that episode delves into the "familial heart of homophobia" like episodes of Roseanne, and as one of the episodes in the series with gay characters, which deals with issues of homophobia and homosexuality. Other scholars would state that Homer would learn the meaning of tolerance at the end, after saying at one point that he wants John to stop using the word queer because it is a word that straight people should use. One scholar, Stephen Tropiano, even rated it as one of the funniest sitcom episodes with LGBTQ themes.

South Park
South Park, created by Trey Parker and Matt Stone, began airing on Comedy Central in August 1997. The show's fourth episode, "Big Gay Al's Big Gay Boat Ride" featured a flamboyant homosexual man named Big Gay Al who ran an animal sanctuary with gay animals. In the course of the show, Big Gay Al would openly display his homosexuality and be an open advocate for gay rights. Despite this array of characters, the show made it clear that cartoons are not only for kids, like The Simpsons, but it did not counter the idea that it is "inappropriate to expose kids to the existence of queer people." Big Gay Al would also be described as a "stereotypical gay man" who teaches those in South Park about the evils of homophobia through history, and would be said to be "delightful," educating pet owners on the "evils of homophobia" in his debut episode. In the episode, Stan says "Gay is Ok!" and brings people to Big Gay Al's gay animal sanctuary. Literature and queer studies scholar James Keller would critically analyze the series saying that it has moderate liberal beliefs and queer sensibilities, along with homophobic bias, even punitive against celebrities who advocate for gay rights like Barbra Streisand. Keller also pointed to the libertarian beliefs of Stone and Parker, with laissez-faire approach to LGBTQ discrimination and rights, affecting the show's narrative choices and creating even-handed views of issues which have diametrically opposed sides. On the other hand, he stated that while the show can be seen as "homophobic in its surface and its context," possible leading to less outcry from the LGBTQ community, the show's three principle gay characters are "caricatures," the word "gay" is used by the protagonists to label each other, even though none of them are gay, and argued that interpreting the show from a queer perspective can recuperate the "residual homophobia" of the show.

One of the characters introduced in the show's first episode would be Liane Cartman, the mother of Cartman. She would later be shown be bisexual and sexually promiscuous. Keller argued that Cartman was also constructed as gay. He pointed to how Cartman acted in episodes such as "Bebe's Boobs Destroy Society," "Cartman's Mom is a Dirty Slut," and "AWESOM-O" as examples of him being associated with "same-sex desire."

In February 1998, in the episode "Tom's Rhinoplasty", Ms. Ellen was introduced. In the episode, she would be an openly lesbian teacher. Her character was a gag referring to the show, Ellen, headlined by Ellen DeGeneres.

In May 1998, Stephen Stotch was introduced in the episode "Chickenlover." He would be a bisexual man and regular customer at the local gay theater and bath house.

In April 1998, in the episode "Terrance and Phillip in Not Without My Anus", Saddam Hussein first appeared as a character. He would be in a relationship with Satan, with the two later breaking up later in the series. Both would be described as some of the show's most "unsympathetic characters," and that that show rarely presents homosexuals "who are easy to like." Even so, Satan, who showed vanity and selfishness, was said to be sympathetic, even with a muscular exterior, while effeminate, passive, and sensitive, while Saddam is the "dominant and sexually exploitative one," and their relationship is said to be 'funny" since it "emulates a heterosexual couple." Satan, Hussein, and Big Gay Al would all appear in the 1999 film, South Park: Bigger, Longer & Uncut. In that film, gender is integral to the plot, as Stan is told by Chef he needs to find the clitoris if he wants Wendy to like him, and he thinks that this is a different creature separate from the female himself, specifically "an oracle to consult in the effort to discover the secret to male-female relations." Others would note that the film's original title was rejected for having the word "hell" but when the title was changed, MPAA approved it.

In July 1999, in an episode of South Park, "Two Guys Naked in a Hot Tub," the dads of Kyle and Stan masturbate one another in a hot tub.

Other adult animations
In December 25, 1994, Lokar, a locust alien and member of the Council of Doom, was introduced in the Space Ghost Coast to Coast Christmas special "A Space Ghost Christmas". Supplementary material for the series had Lokar referred to himself as a confirmed bachelor while an article on the official Cartoon Network website featured a reference to a slang word for gay sex. His sexuality was confirmed in audio commentaries for the Space Ghost Coast to Coast Volume 2 DVD and it was revealed that Lokar died at some point during the series. However, this was eventually contradicted when Lokar returned in the Season 11 episode "Stephen" in where he is shown to be alive and well.

From 1995 to 1997, Crapston Villas aired on Channel 4, a British broadcasting channel. This show would be one of the first animated series on British television to present openly gay characters, specifically Robbie and Larry.

In March 19, 1996, the animated series The Ambiguously Gay Duo, created by Robert Smigel and J. J. Sedelmaier, would premiere on The Dana Carvey Show. It would appear on Saturday Night Live on September 28, and air another 11 episodes until its conclusion in September 2011. The show follows the adventures of Ace and Gary, voiced by Stephen Colbert and Steve Carell, respectively, two superheroes whose sexual orientation is a matter of dispute, and a cavalcade of characters preoccupied with the question. The series is a parody of the stereotypical comic book superhero duo done in the style of Saturday morning cartoons like Super Friends, with shorts intended to satirize suggestions that early Batman comics implied a homosexual relationship between the eponymous title character and his field partner and protégé Robin, a charge most infamously leveled by Fredric Wertham in his 1954 book, Seduction of the Innocent, the research methodology for which was later discredited. This superhero show aired at the time there were other queer-themed live-action segments, like one of a gay weightlifting pair (Hans and Carvey), the "It's Pat" sketch from 1990-1994, which derived much of its humor from "speculation about Pat's gender and sexuality," and comic Terry Sweeney having a role on SNL, becoming the first regular gay performer in television.

In 1997, the short-lived animated series Spicy City aired on HBO. It was the first adults-only animated series predating South Park by one month. The series featured two instances of same-sex relationships between women. The episode "Eye for an Eye" featured Margo, a bisexual police officer who was also corrupt. She was in a relationship with a criminal named Frenchy until she sent her to prison. The following episode "Sex Drive" featured Nisa Lolita, a hard-working police detective who wasn't taken seriously by her male coworkers. She ends up in a relationship with Viper, a cyborg sex worker. Nisa shows no attraction towards men throughout the episode.

In 2001, Suzanna Danuta Walters, a women's studies and sociology professor at Georgetown University, described the show as featuring the "campiest superheroes to ever hit TV-land" with a clear homoerotic subtext. It was also said by Steven Capsuto, a scholar who studies  LGBTQ television images, that the series, rife with "phallic imagery and sexual innuendo" led to a lot of laughter, with adult content placed in animation, which was then considered for kids, and roasted the "campy homoeroticism" that some had read into the 1960s Batman series. In June 2020, Smigel told The Daily Beast that the engine of the show was an "obsession with sexuality" and that he thought that it was funny because the homophobes and everyone are obsessed with finding out whether the superheroes are gay or not, calling it "sport and titillation." He added that the point of the cartoon was that it doesn't matter whether the superheroes have sex or not and said that since there has been "an incredible amount of progress" since the series premiered, he would not write the cartoon today.

The French show, Space Goofs, known as Les Zinzins de L'Espace in French, which aired from 1997 to 2006, has a character named Candy Caramilla. This character is an uptight homosexual neat freak who gets in touch with their feminine side by sometimes disguising themselves as a woman, and flirts with men, is implied to be transgender. This implication is confirmed by the game, "Stupid Invaders" with Candy planning a gender reassignment surgery with the best specialist in the universe. In a 2022 podcast interview with series producer Marc du Pontavice, he stated Candy is supposed to be non-binary but was unable to find the right words at the time.

In the September 21, 1998 episode of Dr. Katz, Professional Therapist, titled "Alderman", the patient, played by Louis C.K., describes a gay dream he had.

In the third episode of Family Guy, an animated series airing on FOX, airing in April 1999, an effeminate man named Bruce Straight would first appear. He would be voiced by Mike Henry, who would describe Bruce as a "mustached man who speaks effeminately in a calm, drawn-out voice with a slight lisp" and has a partner named Jeffrey. Later, Seth MacFarlane, the creator of Family Guy would be noted as airing his "protest against homophobic and exclusionary practices within the perpetuation of traditional 'family values'" and, as such, exploring and portraying "some of the most controversial issues surrounding homosexuality." It would also be said that homosexual characters are part of the family in Family Guy and American Dad!.

In September 1999, Mission Hill began airing on The WB. It would stay there until 2000, before it moved to Adult Swim in 2002. Gus Duncz and Wally Langford, a gay elderly couple in their late 60s, appear in the series, causing Mission Hill to win a GLAAD Media Award for this representation. In the series, Gus has been the lover of Wally for the past 40 years.

All-ages animations

The 1990s saw the premiere of all-ages animated series on ABC, Kids' WB, and YTV with LGBTQ characters. This included Gargoyles, Superman: The Animated Series,  Blazing Dragons,  and George and Martha, with coded characters in  Dexter's Laboratory and The Powerpuff Girls.

Gargoyles would be syndicated for most of its run, between 1994 and 1996, and then would air on ABC for the last two years of its broadcast, from 1996 to 1997. While a number of the characters were LGBTQ, they were not confirmed into years later. Series creator Greg Weisman, in a 2008 interview, series creator Greg Weisman stated that Lexington is gay. In May 2005, Weisman responded to fans about Lexington's gay identity, saying that Lexington hadn't "completely come to terms with his sexuality" when he went out with Angela. He also said that while he wasn't trying to hint with anything in the series, he knew Lexington was gay "sometime in '95 or '96," although he couldn't have addressed in the show directly, because he would have been fired if he had done so. He further said that Lexington, as a gay person, tells his own truths, as does every character.

As for other characters, like Janine Renard, former leader of The Pack, born with the name of Janine Renard, and later legally turns her name to Fox, was confirmed as bisexuall, as she falls in love with David Xanatos, a young businessman, and later has a liking to Titania, the wife of Oberon and queen of the Third race Weisman confirmed her as a bisexual woman in 2016. Owen Burnett on the other hand, who is formerly the aide of Xanatos' aide, was confirmed by Weisman as asexual in response to various fan questions, even as he said that Burnett he had still dated a woman in the past. Additionally, Puck was confirmed by Weisman as bisexual in response to a fan in September 2014. In June 2021, Weisman told Insider that he was not allowed to have LGBTQ representation in the series due to fear of backlash, saying that ABC would "freak out" over responses and said they were "scared of parental response."

On May 18, 1996, Silver Spooner, the sidekick to Barbequor, appeared in an episode of Dexter's Laboratory titled "Dial M for Monkey: Barbequor." Both characters are parodies of Silver Surfer and Galactus, with the episode banned. While some said this was because Silver Spooner was a stereotype of gay men, with complaints to that effect after it aired, others said it had more to do with copyright infringement as the estate of Jack Kirby threatened to sue Cartoon Network over the parody character. The episode was, in later broadcasts, and on its Season 1 DVD (Region 1), replaced with "Dexter's Lab: A Story", an episode from season two.

In February 1997, an episode of Kids' WB's Superman: The Animated Series, titled "Tools of the Trade," introduced lesbian character Maggie Sawyer. Her girlfriend Toby Raynes appeared at her bedside and Dan Turpin's funeral in the two-part episode "Apokolips…Now!" which aired on February 1998. However, they were only secondary or tertiary to the story. Sawyer, a "lesbian superhero with a lover," Raynes, later appeared in a D.C. Comics miniseries named Metropolis S.C.U. The series received the 7th Outstanding Comic Strip GLAAD Media Awards in March 1996.

A show created by Terry Jones and Gavin Scott, Blazing Dragons, aired on Teletoon in Canada, Spacetoon in Arab countries, and Canal+ in France from 1996 to 1998. In the series, Sir Blaze is a member of the Square Table, and is flamboyant and effeminate. Throughout the series, he is implied to be gay. His implicit homosexuality was censored when the series aired on Toon Disney in the United States.

On June 27, 1998, the Buffalo Gals appeared in the Cow and Chicken episode of the same name. The episode only aired once and was banned due to the use of lesbian stereotypes.

Some argued that Buttercup, in the April 7, 1999 episode of The Powerpuff Girls, titled "The Rowdyruff Boys", doesn't enjoy the experience and is the "possible lesbian" of the Powerpuff Girls.

From 1999 to 2000, George and Martha aired on YTV and HBO Family. The preschool series is said to about "celebrating friendship" between the two protagonists George and Martha. Oscar and Wilde are an alligator couple whose names are a reference to gay author Oscar Wilde. They live together and go on vacations. Their relationship was the focus of the episode "The Argument" in where they had a spat. The series was one of the first animated series to ever confirm LGBTQ characters.

Animated films

Gaston and LeFou in the 1991 film Beauty and the Beast and  Jafar from the 1992 film Aladdin were created by a gay animator named Andreas Deja, and sang music by Howard Ashman, who was also gay. The fact that Deja had also worked on Scar in The Lion King and the titular character in Hercules, for example, has been discussed as an influence on the development of some Disney characters. This queer coding, however, had its disadvantages, with networks not wanting to show overt representation. Rebecca Sugar argued that it is "really heavy" for a kid to only exist "as a villain or a joke" in an animated series. In 2011, Deja told news.com.au Disney would have a "family that has two dads or two mums" if they find the "right kind of story with that kind of concept." However, other critics criticized such queer-coded villains as contributing to "homophobic discourse" and equating queerness with evil itself.

In June 1998, Mulan, an animated musical adventure film would begin showing in theaters. The film would include a bisexual captain Li Shang (voiced by BD Wong). Shang, in the film, loved Mulan when she was disguised as a male alter ego named Ping, and in her true form as a woman. However, Shang was not included in the 2020 live-action remake. One of the film's producers said that Shang was dropped in response to the Me Too movement, arguing that "having a commanding officer that is also the sexual love interest was very uncomfortable and we didn't think it was appropriate". This was met with social media backlash from fans of the original film and members of the LGBTQ community, with Reed initially surprised by criticism of Shang's removal, but acknowledged that the character had become an "LGBTQ icon." He added that Shang's role would be served by two new characters, Commander Tung and Chen Honghui. Even so, some reviewers called the interactions between Honghui and Mulan to be "more homoerotic" than Li Shang's in the animated version and "can be read as bisexual" while others criticized the reasoning of Reed as incorrect. Mulan was described, by one scholar as having a character, Mulan herself, who could "successfully 'pass' as the opposite sex" and as subverting her traditionally assigned gender signifiers, while having an "unusually masculine body." It was further stated that as a result, Mulan was the "perfect embodiment of a drag king"  even though she maintains her heterosexuality as she is attracted to Li Sheng, comparing Mulan's interpretation of her sexuality to that of Bugs Bunny. Furthermore, gay playwright Harvey Fierstein voiced a character in Mulan, and only accepted the part after confirming that the rest of the cast was Asian so he would not take work away from an Asian actor.

In September 1999, Harvey Fierstein created the animated special The Sissy Duckling. The special centered on Elmer, a duckling who is implied to be gay. Fierstein also voiced the character. The special was nominated for the GLAAD Media Award for Outstanding Individual Episode.

Timeline of key events
 October 18, 1990: Karl and Homer kiss in The Simpsons episode, "Simpson and Delilah," said to be the first animated male-male kiss to air on network television.
 November 16, 1991: Beauty and the Beast begins showing in theaters across the U.S. In the film, Gaston and LeFou were created by a gay animator named Andreas Deja, as would Jafar from the Aladdin the following year, who sang music by gay composer Howard Ashman.
 October 24, 1994: Gargoyles starts airing on syndicated television. The series would include Lexington, Janine "Fox" Renard, Owen Burnett and Puck.
 1995: Crapston Villas started airing on Channel 4. It would be the first animated series on British television to present openly gay characters.
 March 19, 1996: The Ambiguously Gay Duo premieres on The Dana Carvey Show and later Saturday Night Live. The series would have two heroes who were described as some of the most campy superheroes on TV, with homoerotic subtext between the two heroes.
 February 16, 1997: The Simpsons episode, "Homer's Phobia", airs on FOX. The episode would be described by some as doing more than any live-action shows at the time in exposing intolerance and promoting awareness of gay men.
 September 3, 1997: The South Park episode "Big Gay Al's Big Gay Boat Ride" airs. It includes a flamboyant character, Big Gay Al, is introduced, who becomes an important secondary character. The show will later feature gay characters such as Mr. Slave, Saddam, and Satan.
 June 19, 1998: Mulan begins showing in U.S. theaters. The film would include a bisexual captain named Li Shang.

See also
 Cross-dressing in film and television
 LGBT children's television programming
 List of animated films with LGBT characters
 List of animated series with crossdressing characters
 List of animated series with LGBT characters
 List of anime by release date (1946–1959)
 List of LGBT-related films by year
 List of television series with bisexual characters
 List of yuri works
 List of yuri anime and manga

References

Citations

Sources
 
 
 
 
  
 
 
 

1990s animated television series
Animated television series
LGBT portrayals in mass media
LGBT characters in animation